The Porsche Carrera GT (Project Code 980) is a mid-engine sports car that was manufactured by German automobile manufacturer Porsche from 2004 to 2006. Sports Car International named the Carrera GT number one on its list of Top Sports Cars of the 2000s, and number eight on its Top Sports Cars of All Time list. For its advanced technology and development of its chassis, Popular Science magazine awarded it the "Best of What's New" award in 2003.

History 

The development of the Carrera GT can be traced back to the 911 GT1 and LMP1-98 racing cars. Due in part to the FIA and ACO rule changes in 1998, both designs had ended. Porsche at the time had planned a new Le Mans prototype for the 1999 season.

The car was initially intended to use a turbocharged flat-six engine, but was later redesigned to use a new V10 engine, pushing the project back to planned completion in 2000. The V10 was a unit secretly built by Porsche for the Footwork Formula One team in 1992, but later shelved. The engine was resurrected for the Le Mans prototype.

Porsche did keep part of the project alive by using the 5.5 L V10 from the prototype in a concept car called the Carrera GT shown at the 2000 Paris Motor Show, mainly in an attempt to draw attention to their display. Surprising interest in the vehicle and an influx of revenue provided from the Cayenne helped Porsche decide to produce the car, and development started on a road-legal version that would be produced in small numbers at Porsche's new manufacturing facility in Leipzig. Porsche started a production run of the Carrera GT in 2004. The first Carrera GT went on sale in the United States on 31 January 2004.

Originally a production run of 1,500 cars was planned. However, Porsche announced in August 2005 that it would not continue production of the Carrera GT through to 2006, citing changing airbag regulations in the United States. By the end of production on 6 May 2006, more than 1,270 cars had been sold, with a total of 644 units sold in the United States and 31 units sold in Canada. In the United Kingdom, 49 units were sold.

Design 
A road test in June 2004 by Car and Driver showed that the car can accelerate from 0– in 3.5 seconds, 0– in 6.8 seconds and 0– in 10.8 seconds.

The Carrera GT was initially offered with five basic colours: Guards Red, Fayence Yellow, Basalt Black, GT Silver metallic and Seal Grey. Custom colours were later available from the factory. A traditional six-speed manual transmission is the only available transmission.

The Carrera GT has large side inlets and air dams that help cool the large V10 engine framed by the carbon fibre rear bonnet. Fitted with Porsche's latest Carbon fibre-reinforced Silicon Carbide (C/SiC) ceramic composite braking system, the  SGL Carbon disc brakes are fitted inside the 19 inch front and 20 inch rear 5-spoke alloy wheels. Similar to other Porsche models, such as the 911, the GT includes an electronically operated rear wing which deploys at speeds above .

The interior is trimmed in soft leather. Bose audio system and a navigation system were standard. In typical Porsche fashion, the ignition is present to the left of the steering wheel. This placement dates back to the early days of Le Mans racing when drivers were required to make a running start, hop into their cars, start them and begin the race. The placement of the ignition enabled the driver to start the car with the left hand and put it in gear with the right.

Technical specifications 

Engine
Layout: Longitudinal, rear mid-engine, rear-wheel-drive layout
Engine type: 68° V10, aluminium block and heads
Code: 980/01
Valvetrain: DOHC (chain-driven), 4 valves per cylinder (40 valves total), variable valve timing on intake camshafts, sodium-cooled exhaust valves
Bore × stroke: , Nikasil coated bores, forged titanium connecting rods, forged pistons
Displacement: 
Compression ratio: 12.0:1
Rated power:  @ 8,000 rpm
Max. torque:  @ 5,750 rpm
Specific output: 
Weight to power ratio: 
Redline: 8,400 rpm
Transmission
Clutch: Twin-plate ceramic dry-clutch (PCCC—Porsche Ceramic Composite Clutch)
Gearbox type: 6-speed manual transmission
Body
Tank capacity: 92 litres
Cargo volume: 
Max. payload: 
Ground clearance: 
Dimensions:
Length: 
Width: 
Height: 
Mass: 
Track width: 
Wheelbase: 
Drag Coefficient: 0.39
Fuel consumption for 2004 model
EPA
EPA Rated city, highway: /
Range: 
Tank in gal: 
NEFZ:
Consumption: 28.3 / 11.7 / 17.8 L/100 km
CO2 emission: 429 g/km
Emission level: EURO 4
Estimated range: 
Auto Motor und Sport test:
Max: 22.5 L/100 km
Avg: 19.7 L/100 km

Performance Test Results 
 : 2.06 seconds
 : 2.61 seconds
 : 3.57 seconds (official: 3.9 seconds)
 : 4.33 seconds
 : 5.13 seconds
 : 6.46 seconds
 : 7.59 seconds
0‒: 10.97 seconds
0‒: 19.42 seconds at 
Top speed: 
: 6.35 seconds (in 6th gear)
Braking  to 0: 
Braking  to 0: 
Braking 100 km/h to 0: 33.5 m
Skid pad,  ave g: 0.99

Track tests

Nürburgring Nordschleife: 7:28
Bedford Autodrome: 1:20.2
Top Gear Test Track: 1:19.8

Technology 

Notable technology includes a pure carbon fibre monocoque and subframe produced by ATR Composites Group of Italy, dry sump lubrication and inboard suspension. At speeds above , the electronically operated rear wing raises into the airstream to reduce lift. The radiator of the Carrera GT is about five times the size of that of a 911 Turbo of its time. The car's front and rear suspension system consists of pushrod actuated shock absorbers and dampers with anti-roll bars.

One-offs 

In 2013, Zagato introduced the Porsche Carrera GTZ based on the Porsche Carrera GT. Commissioned by a Swiss Porsche collector and former racing driver, it has a modified carbon fiber body which is more aerodynamic. The car has the same technical specification as the Porsche Carrera GT.

References

Notes

Bibliography

External links

Porsche official website
Final Carrera GT Produced
Past master: Porsche Carrera GT

Carrera GT
Rear mid-engine, rear-wheel-drive vehicles
Roadsters
Cars introduced in 2003